Lyonville railway station was a railway station in Lyonville, Victoria, Australia. The station was opened on Wednesday, 17 March 1880, and closed on Monday, 3 July 1978.

There is no longer any track at the station, although the previously derelict station building and platform have been restored as a private residence. A restored passenger carriage and guard's van are also located at the station.

Though the track has been removed, the station area is still zoned as railway land, but under lease for private use.

By 1969, the platform was 61m in length, and by 1975, the station was working under caretaker conditions.

References

External links
Vicsignals - Lyonville
Vicrailstations - Lyonville

Disused railway stations in Victoria (Australia)